Father Giambattista Varesco  (Trento, 26 November 1735 – Salzburg, 25 August 1805) was a chaplain, musician, poet and (most famously) librettist to Wolfgang Amadeus Mozart. His given name variously appears as Giambattista, Gianbattista, Giovanni Battista and Girolamo Giovanni Battista. He is sometimes referred to with the Italian title Abate or  the French Abbé, both used for priests:
he was chaplain at the Salzburg court chapel from 1766.

Varesco's only familiar work with Mozart is the libretto to Idomeneo;
the abortive L'oca del Cairo is little-known. Varesco also edited Metastasio's libretto for Il re pastore,
one of Mozart's lesser operas. Mozart's commission for Idomeneo came in 1780 from Karl Theodor, Elector of Bavaria;
his court in Munich paid Varesco 90 gulden. Leopold Mozart acted as a local intermediary for his son, and
 their correspondence left many details on the collaboration, and showed the composer's dissatisfaction, primarily with the excessive length of the text. In a letter in December 1780 Mozart wrote:

Ask the Abbate Varesco if we could not break off at the chorus in the second act, Placido e il mare after Elettra's first verse, when the chorus is repeated,--at all events after the second, for it is really far too long. (V.1. - 43/46)

Varesco resented the many cuts and changes that Mozart demanded, and insisted that his original text be published in full, which Mozart used as an excuse for cuts he made without the librettist's approval. In a letter from Mozart to his father, who acted as a go-between for him in Salzburg, Mozart notes Varesco's admission that he had "not the slightest knowledge or experience of the theatre."

By contrast with the extensive documentation of this uneasy collaboration, we have no written record of the collaboration between Mozart and his greatest librettist, Lorenzo da Ponte, whose office was a short walk from Mozart's lodgings in Vienna.

References
 
 .

Italian opera librettists
Wolfgang Amadeus Mozart's librettists
1805 deaths
Italian expatriates in Austria
1735 births
18th-century Italian writers
18th-century Italian male writers
18th-century Italian Roman Catholic priests